The Bay of Plenty Region, often abbreviated to BOP, is a region in the North Island of New Zealand situated around the body of water of the same name. The bay was named by James Cook after he noticed the abundant food supplies at several Māori villages there, in stark contrast to the earlier observations he had made in Poverty Bay.

In the 2006 Census, the Bay of Plenty had an estimated resident population of 257,379, making it the fifth-most populous region in New Zealand. It also has the third-highest regional population density in New Zealand, with only the 11th-largest land area. The major population centres are Tauranga, Rotorua and Whakatane. The Bay of Plenty is one of the fastest growing regions in New Zealand: the regional population increased by 7.5% between 2001 and 2006, with significant growth along the coastal and western parts, and is projected to increase to 277,900 by the year 2011.

Significant horticultural, forestry and tourism industries are well established in the region. However, the Bay of Plenty is the third-most economically deprived region in New Zealand, with the eastern districts being among the least economically developed in the country.  However, in 2011 Business & Economic Research Limited (BERL) identified the Bay of Plenty as one of the top performing regions in economic development, ranking second behind Auckland.  It had the highest employment and GDP growth for 2011 and had the fastest growing medium term GDP.  Tauranga, the region's largest commercial centre, was named New Zealand's top city for economic performance for the 2011 year.

History 

The present Bay of Plenty region was formed in 1989 after a nationwide review and shakeup of top-level local government in New Zealand. The new region incorporated the former counties of Tauranga, Rotorua, Whakatane and Opotiki.

Governance 
The region is subdivided into territorial authorities, which include the Western Bay of Plenty District, Tauranga City, Whakatāne District, Kawerau District, and Ōpōtiki District, as well as parts of Rotorua Lakes District and the town of Rangitaiki in Taupō District.

Bay of Plenty Regional Council is responsible for overseeing regional land use, environmental management and civil defence in the region.

Public health in New Zealand is broken into regions. The Bay of Plenty and Lakes district health boards have public health provided by Toi Te Ora – Public Health.

Geography 

It extends along the eastern coast of the North Island, from the base of the Coromandel Peninsula in the west to Cape Runaway in the east. The region extends 12 nautical miles from the mainland coastline, and also extends from the coastlines of several islands in the bay, notably Mayor Island/Tuhua, Motiti Island, Whale Island and the active volcano of Whakaari/White Island. It extends inland to the sparsely populated forest lands around Rotorua and Murupara.

Much of the central part of the region lies within the Taupo Volcanic Zone, which extends from the centre of the North Island northwards to Whakaari/White Island. Volcanic mountains and lakes, geothermal areas and geological fault lines all dot the landscape. The geothermal region around Rotorua is a major tourist site, while many hot springs in the region are used as swimming areas. The geothermal field near Kawerau is the site of a geothermal power plant that will reportedly meet up to one third of residential and industrial electricity demand in the Eastern Bay of Plenty. Whakaari/White Island, the site of a former sulfur-mining operation, is an active volcanic island popular with tourists. The eruption of Mount Tarawera in 1886 and the 1987 Edgecumbe earthquake were two disasters related to geological activity in the volcanic plateau.

Prominent volcanic cones in the region include Mount Maunganui, Mount Tarawera and Mount Edgecumbe/Putauaki. These features also have cultural significance to local Māori. The Kaimai and Mamaku mountain ranges lie at the western border of the region. Swamp land was formerly concentrated around a number of rivers, but much of this was dredged in the early part of the 20th century to increase land for settlement and other uses. Large native and foreign (planted) forest areas are found in the inland parts of the region. The Kaingaroa Forest is the world's largest planted forest, comprising radiata pine mainly used for timber.

Climate 
The Bay of Plenty Region has warm, humid summers and mild winters. It is one of the warmest regions in New Zealand, particularly along the coastline, and most areas experience at least 2,200 hours of sunshine per annum. Rainfall occurs more frequently in winter than in summer, but tropical storms in summer and autumn can produce heavy rain with high winds.

Demographics 

Bay of Plenty Region had a population of 308,499 at the 2018 New Zealand census, an increase of 40,758 people (15.2%) since the 2013 census, and an increase of 51,120 people (19.9%) since the 2006 census. There were 110,919 households, comprising 150,366 males and 158,133 females, giving a sex ratio of 0.95 males per female. The median age was 40.2 years (compared with 37.4 years nationally), with 64,182 people (20.8%) aged under 15 years, 53,832 (17.4%) aged 15 to 29, 133,386 (43.2%) aged 30 to 64, and 57,096 (18.5%) aged 65 or older.

Ethnicities were 73.6% European/Pākehā, 29.1% Māori, 3.5% Pacific peoples, 7.2% Asian, and 1.8% other ethnicities. People may identify with more than one ethnicity.

The percentage of people born overseas was 18.6, compared with 27.1% nationally.

Although some people chose not to answer the census's question about religious affiliation, 49.9% had no religion, 34.6% were Christian, 3.8% had Māori religious beliefs, 1.6% were Sikh, 1.1% were Hindu, 0.3% were Muslim, 0.5% were Buddhist and 1.3% had other religions.

Of those at least 15 years old, 43,086 (17.6%) people had a bachelor's or higher degree, and 46,263 (18.9%) people had no formal qualifications. The median income was $29,100, compared with $31,800 nationally. 35,295 people (14.4%) earned over $70,000 compared to 17.2% nationally. The employment status of those at least 15 was that 114,264 (46.8%) people were employed full-time, 37,503 (15.4%) were part-time, and 10,926 (4.5%) were unemployed.

The Bay of Plenty is the fifth-most populous region in New Zealand, accounting for % of the national population.

The coast is dotted with several sizeable settlements, the largest of which is the conurbation of the city of Tauranga and its neighbour Mount Maunganui in the west. The town of Whakatāne is located in the centre of the coast. Other towns of note include Waihi Beach, Katikati, Maketu, Pukehina Beach and Ōpōtiki.

Most of the population along the coast is concentrated in the western and central parts of the shore; the eastern part is sparsely populated hill country. The region has the third-highest regional population density in New Zealand, with only the 11th-largest land area. The major population centres are Tauranga, Rotorua and Whakatāne.

Significant horticultural, forestry and tourism industries are well established in the region. However, the Bay of Plenty is the third-most economically deprived region in New Zealand, with the eastern districts being among the least economically developed in the country. However, in 2011 Business & Economic Research Limited (BERL) identified the Bay of Plenty as one of the top performing regions in economic development, ranking second behind Auckland. It had the highest employment and GDP growth for 2011 and had the fastest growing medium term GDP. Tauranga, the region's largest commercial centre, was named New Zealand's top city for economic performance for the 2011 year.

Urban areas

Ethnicity/identity

In the 2018 census, ethnicities were 73.6% European/Pākehā, 29.1% Māori, 3.5% Pacific peoples, 7.2% Asian, and 1.8% other ethnicities. People may identify with more than one ethnicity.

Only 18.6% of the regional population was born overseas, compared with 27.1% nationally. English is the most widely spoken language. Te Reo Māori is the most common minority language, spoken by 8.6% of the population, compared with 4.0% nationally.

Economy 
The subnational gross domestic product (GDP) of Bay of Plenty was estimated at NZ$17.24 billion in the year to March 2019, 5.7% of New Zealand's national GDP. The subnational GDP per capita was estimated at $53,700 in the same period. In the year to March 2018, primary industries contributed $1.89 billion (11.6%) to the regional GDP, goods-producing industries contributed $3.24 billion (20.0%), service industries contributed $9.72 billion (59.8%), and taxes and duties contributed $1.39 billion (8.6%).

Agriculture, natural resources and tourism are the major industries. Most (96 per cent) of the region is defined as 'rural', with 22% of land usage representing farm land and 38% representing nature reserve land. The most common agricultural land uses are horticulture, dairy, grazing and sheep farming. The region has over 11,500 hectares of horticultural land, predominantly producing kiwifruit and avocadoes. The region also has an abundance of coastal, forestry and geothermal resources. Forestry emerged as a vital industry in the 1950s, with radiata pine being planted during the early 20th century. Forestry is commercially planted and managed, mostly using planted foreign tree species, and timber is sent to the Port of Tauranga for export. Geothermal activity is a source of tourism, and geothermal energy is emerging as a major regional source of electricity. Tourism is the other notable industry, accounting for 15% of the region's GDP from March 2000 to 2004.

Overall economic growth in the Bay of Plenty averaged 2.1% between March 2000 and 2004, compared with the national rate of 3.5%, although per capita real GDP growth in the five years to March 2003 matched the national growth rate at an averaged 2.3%. In the 2013 Census, the median annual income was $26,200, below the national median of $28,500. Further, 39.3% of people aged 15 years or older earned an annual income of less than $20,000, compared with 38.2% of people nationally. Unemployment was at 9.0% of people 15 years or older, compared with 7.1% nationally.

Tourism 

The Bay of Plenty Region is a popular holiday destination due to the warm and sunny summer climate and public beaches. The region received over 645,000 tourists in 2003, equivalent to one in three visitors to New Zealand coming to the region. Rotorua is a popular destination for international visitors, in particular the surrounding geothermal areas and Māori cultural centres. Tauranga is a popular domestic tourism destination, and also becoming popular internationally. Whale watching has become a popular attraction as the number of whales such as blue whales and humpback whales migrating into bay waters began to recover.

Transport 

The main rail line in the region is the East Coast Main Trunk Railway, which extends from Hamilton in the Waikato region to Kawerau via Tauranga, with the Murupara Branch Railway extending the Kawerau terminus to Murupara, and the Mount Maunganui Branch connecting the Mount Maunganui terminus with the East Coast Main Trunk. Rail networks in the region are used exclusively for freight. The hub of regional economic activity is the Port of Tauranga, with well-established rail and road connections to other parts of the region. Three commercial airports also operate in the Bay of Plenty: Tauranga Airport, Rotorua Airport and Whakatane Airport.

Car travel remains the dominant form of transport in the region. In 2002, the number of vehicles owned in the region was 189,000, with an average of 1.51 vehicles per household. Public transport bus services exist only in Tauranga and Rotorua. Significant growth in the Western Bay of Plenty District has seen increased strain on road infrastructure, particularly with increasing traffic congestion in Tauranga. Due to this growth, a new highway network is being planned and constructed in Tauranga to join with its current network spanning on the western side of the city. The NZ Transport Agency, in conjunction with Environment Bay of Plenty, Tauranga City and the Western Bay of Plenty District Councils, is planning to build an Eastern Motorway bypassing Te Puke, a Western Motorway bypassing Ōmokoroa and a smaller Southern Motorway.

Sport 

The Bay of Plenty is represented in several domestic sporting competitions. The Bay of Plenty Rugby Union oversees the Bay of Plenty Steamers, who play in the Mitre10 Cup. The Steamers are also a feeder club for the Chiefs who play in the Super Rugby competition. The Waikato/Bay of Plenty Magic compete in the ANZ Championship in netball, having previously played in the National Bank Cup. Bay of Plenty also makes up a part of the Northern Districts cricket region and the Midlands hockey region.

Media

Magazines 
 Plenty Magazine
 UNO. Magazine
 Focus magazine

Newspapers 
 Weekend Sun/SunLive
 Bay of Plenty Times
 Rotorua Daily Post
 Te Puke Times
 Opotiki News
 Whakatane Beacon

Radio stations

Television 
 TV Central (Freeview Channel 30) – Bay of Plenty & Waikato (shut down in April 2015)
 TV Rotorua-Rotorua (shut down in December 2013)
 Geyser Television-Rotorua (shut down in December 2013)

Notable people
 

Te Purewa (?–1842?), tribal leader, war leader and peacemaker
Maharaia Winiata (1912–1960), a New Zealand tribal leader, Methodist minister, teacher, anthropologist, broadcaster and community leader

Sister provinces
 Jiangxi Province, China

See also 
 List of schools in the Bay of Plenty Region

References

External links 

 Bay of Plenty Regional Council
 Bay of Plenty Times – regional newspaper
 Bay of Plenty in Te Ara the Encyclopedia of New Zealand
 Bay of Plenty Area Information